Pocatello, Idaho, has been home to minor league baseball teams who competed in 35 seasons of Minor League Baseball, between 1900 and 1993.

History
The Pocatello Indians played as members of the Independent Utah-Idaho Intermountain League in 1900.

The Pocatello Bannocks played in the Utah–Idaho League from 1926 to 1928. Pocatello's teams since then have played in the Pioneer League. The Pocatello Cardinals, an affiliate of the St. Louis Cardinals, played during the seasons of 1939–1942 and 1946–1951, as the league paused for three years during World War II. The Cardinals won two Pioneer League titles in 1942 and 1949.

A new version of the Pocatello Bannocks started in 1952, originally as a St. Louis Browns affiliate for the first two years. In 1957, they changed their name to the Pocatello A's to reflect their new connection to the Kansas City Athletics, and then in 1960 to the Pocatello Giants as the San Francisco Giants took over as their affiliate. After a final season as the Pocatello Bannocks in 1961, they changed their name to the Pocatello Chiefs in 1962 and remained under that name until they moved to Ogden, Utah, to become the Ogden Dodgers in 1966. Hall of Fame manager Tommy Lasorda managed the Chiefs in 1965.

In 1984, baseball returned to Pocatello for two seasons, when the Lethbridge Dodgers relocated as the Pocatello Gems. This was the same team that had left in 1966.

The Pocatello Giants were affiliated with the San Francisco Giants for the 1988 and 1989 seasons; prior affiliation was with the Oakland A's. The home stadium was Halliwell Park, located on Alameda Drive. After the 1989 season the Giants ended their farm team affiliation with the franchise. The franchise became an independent/co-op team and was renamed the Gate City Pioneers for the 1990 season; that team featured players from the Montreal Expos and Chicago White Sox farm systems as well as minor league players from the Hiroshima Toyo Carp of the Nippon Professional Baseball. For the 1991 season, the team changed its name to the Pocatello Pioneers. The franchise to relocated to Lethbridge, Alberta, where they became the Lethbridge Mounties.

Pocatello gained one more team in 1993, when the Salt Lake City Trappers - forced out by the move of a Class AAA Pacific Coast League team to the city - moved to town as the Pocatello Posse in 1993. After the 1993 season, the team moved to Ogden, Utah, to become the Ogden Raptors. 

Semi-pro team
A new team, the Gate City Grays, was formed in 2014 as part of the Northern Utah League. They were undefeated in their first regular season and won the league championship the next two seasons. The Grays are a semi-professional team not associated with MLB. Games are played at Halliwell Park.

Timeline

Notable alumni

Baseball Hall of Fame Alumni
 Tommy Lasorda (1965, MGR)  Inducted, 1997

Notable MLB Alumni
 Corey Lidle (1993) 
 Pat Rapp (1989)
 Jack Hiatt (1988, MGR)
 Rafael Landestoy (1987, MGR)
 Walt Weiss (1985) MLB All-Star; 1988 AL Rookie of the Year
 Greg Goossen (1964)
 Bill Sudakis (1964)
 Jim Strickland (1964–65)
 John Boccabella (1963)
 Fred Wenz (1961–62)
 Mike McCormick (1960, MGR)
 Chico Salmon (1960) 
 Tommy Giordano (1959, MGR) MLB Player; MLB Scout: Drafted Cal Ripken Jr.
 John O'Donoghue (1959) MLB All-Star
 Diego Segui (1959) 1970 AL ERA leader
 Dan Pfister (1958)
 Lou Klimchock (1958) 
 Alex George (1958) 
 Norm Bass (1958) 2-Sport Athlete: MLB (1961-63), Denver Broncos AFL (1964)
 Joe Lutz (1956) 
 Lou Stringer (1956) 
 Frank Lucchesi (1955) 
 Hersh Martin (1953) MLB All-Star
 Willie Tasby (1952)
 Larry Jackson (1951) 5 x MLB All-Star;  1964 NL Wins Leader
 Dick Rand (1950)
 John Romonosky (1950)
 Bob Mahoney (1948)
 Solly Hemus (1946) 
 Bill Brenzel (1946)
 Nick Cullop (1942)
 Ed Chandler (1941) 
 Bill DeLancey (1941, MGR)
 Eddie Malone (1939)
 Jim Mosolf (1928)
 Wally Berger (1927) 4 x MLB All-Star; 1935 NL RBI Leader; 1935 NL HR Leader
 Woody Jensen (1927–28) 
 Bruce Cunningham (1926)
 Doug Taitt (1926)

References

San Francisco Giants minor league affiliates
Oakland Athletics minor league affiliates
Los Angeles Dodgers minor league affiliates
Chicago Cubs minor league affiliates
Boston Red Sox minor league affiliates
Kansas City Athletics minor league affiliates
St. Louis Browns minor league affiliates
St. Louis Cardinals minor league affiliates
Defunct Pioneer League (baseball) teams
Defunct minor league baseball teams
Professional baseball teams in Idaho
Baseball
Baseball teams established in 1926
Baseball teams disestablished in 1993
1926 establishments in Idaho
1993 disestablishments in Idaho
Defunct baseball teams in Idaho